The 2022 UCI Mountain Bike Marathon World Championships took place in Haderslev, Denmark on 17 September 2022. It was the 20th edition of the UCI Mountain Bike Marathon World Championships.

Medal summary

References

External links
Official website

2022
World Championships
Mountain Bike Marathon World Championships
International cycle races hosted by Denmark
Mountain Bike Marathon World Championships
2022 UCI Mountain Bike Marathon World Championships